The discography of Owen, an American indie rock band. The discography consists of seven studio albums, one compilation albums, two extended plays (EPs), and three split albums.

Albums

Studio albums

Extended plays

Split albums

Singles

Videography

Music videos

References

External links
 
 
 Owen at Discogs
 Owen at Rate Your Music

Discographies of American artists